The women's shot put event at the 2006 World Junior Championships in Athletics was held in Beijing, China, at Chaoyang Sports Centre on 15 August.

Medalists

Results

Final
15 August

Qualifications
15 August

Group A

Group B

Participation
According to an unofficial count, 29 athletes from 23 countries participated in the event.

References

Shot put
Shot put at the World Athletics U20 Championships